The 2010 edition of the Campeonato Carioca was the 109th edition of football of FFERJ (Federação de Futebol do Estado do Rio de Janeiro, or Rio de Janeiro State Football Federation). It began on January 16, 2010 and ended on April 28, 2010.

Sixteen teams contested the title. Cabofriense and Mesquita were relegated the previous year and were replaced by Olaria and America from the Carioca Série B.

Teams

System
The 16 clubs were divided into two groups.

Group A: Americano, Bangu, Boavista, Duque de Caxias, Flamengo, Fluminense, Olaria, and Volta Redonda;

Group B: America, Botafogo, Friburguense, Macaé, Madureira, Resende, Tigres do Brasil, and Vasco da Gama. 

The tournament was divided in two stages:

 Taça Guanabara: teams from each group played in single round-robin format against the others in their group. Top two teams in each group advanced to semifinal and then, to the final, played in one single match at Maracanã Stadium. Botafogo won the title, defeating  Vasco da Gama in the final 2-0.
 Taça Rio: teams from one group play against teams from the other group once. Top two teams in each group qualify to semifinal and final, to be played in one single match at Maracanã Stadium. Botafogo won this final as well, defeating Flamengo won 2-1 thus clinching the championship without the need for a final round.

Championship

Taça Guanabara

Group A

Group B

Taça Moisés Mathias de Andrade

Semifinals

Finals

Semifinals

Finals

Taça Rio

Group A

Group B

Taça João Ellis Filho

Semifinals

Finals

Semifinals

Finals

Aggregate table

Relegation table
Per the rules of the Campeonato Carioca, for the purposes of relegation the standard tiebreaker criteria are not used. Since Duque de Caxias, Resende, and Friburguense all finished equal with 12 points in the relegation zone of the aggregate table, an additional double round-robin was played to determine relegation.

Campeonato Carioca seasons
Carioca